Inception is a 2010 film directed by Christopher Nolan.

Inception may also refer to:

Music
 Inception (Download album), 2002
 Inception (McCoy Tyner album) or the title song, 1962
 Inception (Sanctuary album), 2017
 Inception: Music from the Motion Picture, a soundtrack album from the 2010 film
 Inception, the first disc of the Bee Gees album Inception/Nostalgia, 1970
 "Inception", a song by Ateez from Zero: Fever Part.1, 2020

Other uses
 Inception Motorsports, now Swan Racing, a stock car racing team
 WWA Inception, a 2001 professional wrestling event
 Inception, a 1991 novel by W. A. Harbinson
 Inception, a 2010 novel by S. D. Perry and Britta Dennison

See also
 Concept (disambiguation)
 Conception (disambiguation)